Thomas Holliday Barker (6 July 1818 – 26 June 1889) was an English temperance and vegetarianism advocate.

Biography

Halliday was born in Peterborough on 6 July 1818. As a young man he was employed as a clerk for a wine merchant. He worked for Wood & Westhead warehousemen in Manchester from 1844 to 1851. Then he became an accountant and commission agent at an office on Princess Street, Manchester. He suffered from poor health and converted to teetotalism. In 1837, he signed an abstinence pledge and became secretary of the Spalding Temperance Society.

In 1843, he refused to drink the fermented wine at Wesleyan chapel in Lincoln. This caused controversy and he was disciplined by the church so severed his connection with them. He appealed for support to Frederic Richard Lees. Barker was a founding member of the United Kingdom Alliance (UKA) and its secretary from 1853 to 1883. He was paid well at £500 a year and became a well known temperance leader in Britain. He married Millicent Bates in 1844, they had four sons.

Barker communicated with American temperance advocates such as Edward C. Delavan and Neal Dow. He was a founder of the Union and Emancipation Society. Barker was a vegetarian. In the 1850s, he served in the committee of the Manchester and Salford Vegetarian Association. He authored the vegetarian book, Thoughts, Facts and Hints on Human Dietetics. He was influential in converting Francis William Newman to vegetarianism. Barker was an early member of the Vegetarian Society.

Barker died in Fallowfield on 26 June 1889.

Selected publications

Thoughts, Facts and Hints on Human Dietetics (1870)

References

External links
Barker, Thomas H. (Thomas Holliday), 1818-1889 (Digital Commonwealth)

1818 births
1889 deaths
British vegetarianism activists
English temperance activists
People associated with the Vegetarian Society
People from Peterborough